Luc Picard (born 24 September 1961) is a French Canadian actor, director and comedian. He was born on September 24, 1961, in Lachine, Quebec, Canada. He has played numerous characters in diverse roles.

Early life and education 
Picard was born in Lachine, Quebec. He trained at the Conservatoire d'art dramatique de Montréal, and quickly became a favourite with Quebec audiences with his frequent appearances on television.

Career 
During the 1990s, following his debut performance in Letters of Transit (Les Sauf-conduits) he slowly developed as a film star with character roles in a variety of films, especially those by Pierre Falardeau. In 2002, Picard scored a double triumph with a Genie Award for his performance as the psychotic cult leader in Savage Messiah and a Prix Jutra for The Collector, directed by Jean Beaudin. In 2005, he directed his first feature, Audition, which was followed by Babine in 2008, Ésimésac in 2012, 9 in 2016, and Cross My Heart in 2017.

He is most commonly known for his portrayal of the infamous Michel Chartrand in the biographical TV series Simmone et Chartrand, where he was nominated for Gemini Awards. His acting film credits also include A Sunday in Kigali (Un dimanche a Kigali), Cap Tourmente, The Woman Who Drinks (La Femme qui boit), The Last Breath (Le Dernier souffle), Detour (Détour), Night Song, Isla Blanca and Bad Seeds (Les Mauvaises herbes).

In 2016, he directed a segment of the collective film 9. He both directed and stars in the 2021 film Confessions of a Hitman about Canadian contract killer Gerald Gallant.

Personal life 
He was formerly married to actress Isabel Richer, until they announced their split in 2013. Their son Henri Picard is an actor.

Filmography

Film

Television

References

External links

1961 births
Living people
Canadian male film actors
Canadian male stage actors
Film directors from Montreal
Male actors from Montreal
Writers from Montreal
Université du Québec à Montréal alumni
People from Lachine, Quebec
Best Actor Genie and Canadian Screen Award winners
Canadian screenwriters in French
20th-century Canadian male actors
21st-century Canadian male actors
Best Actor Jutra and Iris Award winners
Best Supporting Actor Jutra and Iris Award winners